The 2018 Union Budget of India was the annual financial statement (AFS), demand for grants, appropriation bill and finance bill of India for the financial year 2018–19.

It was presented to Parliament on 1 February 2018 by Finance Minister Arun Jaitley.

Premise 
The 2018 budget was considered to be a crucial one, as it would be the first since the rollout of the Goods and Service Tax (GST) regime in India. It was widely expected that the budget would either increase the exemption limit, or introduce a standard deduction for salaried people to reduce the tax burden, in addition to a reduction of the tax rate for the – slab from 20% to 10%, and an increase in the 30% band above . The budget also came on the heels of a cut in the corporate tax rate in the United States. Printing of the budget began on 20 January 2018 with the traditional Halwa ceremony.

Significant announcements
The budget contained a number of significant announcements. It included a healthcare programme called the National Health Protection Scheme (Ayushman Bharat) to cover 10 crore (100 million) poor families. The Government proposed to contribute 12% to the Employees' Provident Fund for new employees for three years.

There was no reduction in personal income tax rates,
and the Cess on income tax was to be increased from 3% to 4%. A 10% tax on long-term capital gains (LTCG) was reintroduced after a 14-year absence. Customs duties were increased for various products. A special scheme to tackle air pollution in Delhi was also introduced. The salaries of Members of Parliament were doubled and their total emoluments are likely to go up from Rs 1.4 lakh to Rs 2.3 lakh per month. Further, the salaries will be increased every five years.

Reactions
Reaction to the budget was mixed-to-positive.

Political 
Political reaction to the budget was mixed.
Bharatiya Janata Party (BJP) leader and Prime Minister, Narendra Modi said that the budget is "development-friendly," focused on the needs of the rural areas and will strengthen the vision of a "new-India". The Congress leader, former prime minister and noted economist Manmohan Singh suggested that the arithmetic behind the budget was "faulty". The general secretary of the Communist Party of India (Marxist) (CPI (M)), Sitaram Yechury said the budget was "unconnected to ground realities". Andhra Pradesh Chief Minister Sri.N.Chandra Babu Naidu is not satisfied with the budget planning as it completely ignored the special status and special package for the state.

Aam Aadmi Party (AAP) leader and chief minister of Delhi, Arvind Kejriwal said on Twitter that the budget contained nothing for the middle class and traders. Chief Minister of Bihar, Nitish Kumar, Janta Dal (United) (JDU) leader, praised the budget for the proposals on minimum support price for farmers and the healthcare scheme. Congress leader and former finance minister P. Chidambaram said that Finance Minister Arun Jaitley had failed the fiscal consolidation test, and that there was no relief for the average taxpayer.

Stock market 
Both of India's national indices, the BSE SENSEX and NIFTY 50, fell sharply in the aftermath of the budget. The government, however, said that the fall in the stock market was not solely due to the budget. Finance and Revenue Secretary, Dr. Hasmukh Adhia said that fall in stock indices was due to global market meltdown, and not because of the reintroduction of LTCG tax, he added the government will look into the slump.

Others 
Credit rating agency, Fitch, said that the budget, whilst supporting growth, does not address the problem of fiscal consolidation, and leaves the problem of India's relatively weak finances, to the next government. Economic Affairs Secretary, Subhash Chandra Garg, said, that the government would try to convince credit rating agencies, like Standard and Poor's and Fitch, on its commitments to fiscal consolidation.

References

External links 

Union budgets of India
2018 in Indian economy
2018 government budgets
Modi administration